Hsinchu County electoral constituencies consist of 2 single-member constituencies, each represented by a member of the Republic of China Legislative Yuan. From the 2020 legislative election onwards, the number of Hsinchu County's seats was increased to 2 due to the county's increase in population, as it exceeded the 315,019 average for each constituency.

Current constituencies

Hsinchu County Constituency I - Xinfeng, Hukou, Xinpu, Qionglin, Guanxi, Jianshi Townships, Zhubei City (12 villages)
Hsinchu County Constituency II - Zhudong, Hengshan, Baoshan, Beipu, Emei, Wufeng Townships, Zhubei City (19 villages)

Historical constituencies

2008-2016
Hsinchu County Constituency

Legislators

 Chiu Ching-chun resigned in 2009 after his election as Hsinchu County magistrate.

Election results

References

Constituencies in Taiwan